"Libera me" ("Deliver me") is a responsory sung in the Office of the Dead in the Catholic Church, and at the absolution of the dead, a service of prayers for the dead said beside the coffin immediately after the Requiem Mass and before burial. The text asks God to have mercy upon the deceased person at the Last Judgment. In addition to the Gregorian chant in the Roman Gradual, many composers have written settings for the text, including Tomás Luis de Victoria,  Anton Bruckner (two settings), Giuseppe Verdi, Gabriel Fauré, Maurice Duruflé, Igor Stravinsky, Benjamin Britten, Sigismund von Neukomm, Orlande de Lassus, Krzysztof Penderecki, Antonio Salieri, Lorenzo Perosi, Arnold Rosner and Patrick Gowers (first stanza only). The Christian technical thrash band Believer also used the entire text in the operatically sung section of "Dies Iræ (Day of Wrath)" in their 1990 album Sanity Obscure.

The responsory is begun by a cantor, who sings the versicles alone, and the responses are sung by the choir. The text is written in the first-person singular, "Deliver me, O Lord, from eternal death on that fearful day", a dramatic substitution in which the choir speaks for the dead person.

In the traditional Office, "Libera me" is also said on All Souls' Day (2 November) and whenever all three nocturns of Matins of the Dead are recited.

References

Christian funeral music
Latin-language Christian hymns
Catholic liturgy
Liturgy of the Hours
Latin religious words and phrases